Swain County is a county located on the far western border of the U.S. state of North Carolina. As of the 2020 census, the population was 14,117. Its county seat is Bryson City.

Four rivers flow through the mountainous terrain of Swain County: the Nantahala, Oconaluftee, Tuckaseegee and the Little Tennessee. Their valleys were occupied for thousands of years by various societies of indigenous peoples, including the South Appalachian Mississippian culture era, and the historic Cherokee people. Today Native Americans, mostly members of the federally recognized Eastern Band of Cherokee Indians, comprise 29% of the population in Swain County.

History
This area was occupied for thousands of years by cultures of indigenous peoples, who successively settled in the valleys of the three rivers and their tributaries. During the Woodland and South Appalachian Mississippian culture period, the latter beginning about 1000 CE, the peoples built earthwork platform mounds as their central public architecture. The more influential villages were each organized around a single mound with smaller villages nearby. The earliest European explorers, including two Spanish expeditions of the mid-to-late 16th century, are believed to have encountered Mississippian chiefdoms in some parts of the interior of the Southeast.

The historic Cherokee people emerged as a culture, and they became the primary occupants of a large homeland taking in what is now known as western Virginia, western North and South Carolina, southeastern Tennessee, northeast Georgia and northern Alabama. Numerous Cherokee towns were located along the Tuckaseegee River in this area, including Kituwa above the confluence with the Little Tennessee River. It is considered the Cherokee 'mother town'. The Eastern Band of Cherokee Indians (EBCI) acquired the Kituwa mound and former town site in 1996, and preserve it as sacred ground.

After the American Revolutionary War, more European Americans moved into this territory, seeking new lands west of the Appalachian Mountains. They came into increasing conflict with the Cherokee and other tribes whose territory they encroached on. Under President Andrew Jackson, Congress passed the Indian Removal Act of 1830, to force the Five Civilized Tribes out of the Southeast. He used federal army forces to round up and accompany most of the Cherokee to Indian Territory west of the Mississippi River (the area was later admitted in 1907 as the state of Oklahoma).

Population growth was slow in the more isolated Swain County. It was not organized by European Americans until 1871 during the Reconstruction era, when it was formed from parts of Jackson and Macon counties. It was named for David L. Swain, governor of North Carolina from 1832 to 1835 during the time of Indian Removal, and president of the University of North Carolina from 1835 to 1868.

Present-day Bryson City, designated as the county seat, developed on both sides of the Tuckaseegee River, which passes and completely surrounds the Bryson City Island Park. After that, it enters Fontana Lake and flows into the Little Tennessee River.

In 1868 the federal government recognized the Eastern Band of Cherokee Indians, made up of people who had stayed at the time of removal and their descendants. In the 1870s, they purchased within what is now Swain County the land area that became known the "Qualla Boundary" land trust. They are the only federally recognized tribe in North Carolina.

Geography

The county is located in far Western North Carolina in the Great Smoky Mountains. It holds more of the Great Smoky Mountains National Park than any other county in North Carolina or Tennessee. The highest point in the county is Clingmans Dome, elevation 6,643 feet, located on the NC/TN border. Clingman's is the third-highest peak in North Carolina. A walkable observation tower is located on its summit. The highest mountain in North Carolina and in the United States east of the Mississippi River is Mt. Mitchell, 6,684 feet, located northeast of Asheville, North Carolina in Yancey County.

Three rivers ultimately feed the Little Tennessee River, which flows through the mountains into Tennessee. The Nantahala River is one of the most popular whitewater rafting rivers in the nation. It is a tributary of the Little Tennessee River.

Indian reservation 
The Oconaluftee River flows through Swain County and the town of Cherokee, where the federally recognized Eastern Band of Cherokee Indians is based. Their Qualla Boundary occupies territory in both Swain and Jackson counties. The Oconaluftee is a tributary of the Tuckaseegee River. Ancient Cherokee towns were located along both of these rivers. The Tuckaseegee flows into the Little Tennessee River before it leaves North Carolina. It also had important Cherokee towns, each developed around an earthwork mound. The Cherokee built their communal townhouse of top of these mounds.

National protected areas 
 Blue Ridge Parkway (part)
 Cherokee Indian Reservation, Eastern Band of Cherokees (part)
 Great Smoky Mountains National Park (part)
 Nantahala National Forest (part)

State and local protected sites 
 Clingmans Dome
 Shuckstack Fire Tower

Major water bodies 
 Brush Creek
 Bunches Creek
 Cullasaja River
 Deep Creek
 Fingerlake
 Fontana Lake
 Forney Creek
 Licklog Creek
 Little Tennessee River
 Nantahala River
 Noland Creek
 Oconaluftee River
 Pigeon Creek
 Tuckasegee River
 Wesser Creek

Adjacent counties
 Sevier County, Tennessee - north
 Haywood County - east
 Jackson County - southeast
 Macon County - south
 Graham County - southwest
 Blount County, Tennessee - northwest

Major highways

Major infrastructure
 Bryson City Depot
 Great Smoky Mountains Railroad, freight and heritage railroad company based in Bryson City
 Sossamon Field (57NC)
 Swain Public Transit, providing requested transportation services in county

Demographics

2020 census

As of the 2020 United States census, there were 14,117 people, 5,620 households, and 3,615 families residing in the county.

2000 census
As of the census of 2000, there were 12,968 people, 5,137 households, and 3,631 families residing in the county. The population density was 25 people per square mile (9/km2). There were 7,105 housing units at an average density of 14 per square mile (5/km2). The racial makeup of the county was 66.33% White, 1.70% Black or African American, 29.03% Native American, 0.15% Asian, 0.01% Pacific Islander, 0.49% from other races, and 2.28% from two or more races. 1.47% of the population were Hispanic or Latino of any race. 16.3% were of American, 8.0% Irish, 7.6% Scots-Irish, 6.9% German and 6.6% English ancestry according to Census 2000. 95.2% spoke English, 2.9% Cherokee and 1.3% Spanish as their first language.

There were 5,137 households, out of which 30.00% had children under the age of 18 living with them, 52.30% were married couples living together, 13.90% had a female householder with no husband present, and 29.30% were non-families. 25.80% of all households were made up of individuals, and 11.10% had someone living alone who was 65 years of age or older. The average household size was 2.44 and the average family size was 2.91.

In the county, the population was spread out, with 24.30% under the age of 18, 8.30% from 18 to 24, 26.70% from 25 to 44, 25.40% from 45 to 64, and 15.30% who were 65 years of age or older. The median age was 39 years. For every 100 females there were 94.60 males. For every 100 females age 18 and over, there were 91.20 males.

The median income for a household in the county was $28,608, and the median income for a family was $33,786. Males had a median income of $26,570 versus $20,722 for females. The per capita income for the county was $14,647. About 13.30% of families and 18.30% of the population were below the poverty line, including 25.60% of those under age 18 and 19.10% of those age 65 or over.

Politics, law and government

Politics
Swain has voted Republican the last six Presidential elections, but historically has been a swing county, with no candidate from either major party obtaining under 37 percent of the county's vote between 1976 and 2012, and no margin larger than twelve percentage points occurring in any election between 1984 and 2012. In 2016 Donald Trump won the county by twenty-three percentage points with the typical strong anti-Democratic swing of most counties in Appalachia, though his margin decreased in the 2020 election. Swain was solidly Democratic during the Third Party System, but the Populist movement dramatically increased the success of progressive Republicans between 1896 and 1928. However, the victory in the county of Progressive Party candidate Theodore Roosevelt in 1912 and subsequent dominance of liberal Democrats like Franklin D. Roosevelt and Adlai Stevenson suggest that the county's voters were drawn more to the relatively progressive agendas of these candidates than they were to any party label.

County government

Board of Commissioners
Swain County is governed by an elected Board of Commissioners. The County Manager oversees the day-to-day management of the county and supervises the administration of all County offices, departments, boards, commissions and agencies. The county manager attends all meetings of the Board of Commissioners, recommends measures that he considers expedient, and executes decisions made by the Board.

Swain County is a member of the regional Southwestern Commission council of governments.

Qualla Boundary government
The town of Cherokee is within the Qualla Boundary, land purchased by the Eastern Band of Cherokee Indians in the 1870s. It has its own government, consisting of an elected chief and elected council members from each community within the tribe. The tribe is considered sovereign and only adheres to its own laws and the laws of the federal government. This allows the town of Cherokee to have a casino, despite casinos being outlawed in North Carolina. This was conditional on the adoption of a tribal-state gaming compact agreed to by both the tribe and the state, as well as approved by the federal government.

Policing and law enforcement
The Swain County Sheriff provides court protection, jail administration, patrol and detective services for the unincorporated areas of the county. Bryson City has a municipal police department.

Education
Swain County Schools serves all of the county except for the part in the Cherokee reservation, which is in Cherokee Central Schools. Swain County High School serves the former and Cherokee Central High School serves the latter.

Communities

Town
 Bryson City (county seat)

Census-designated place
 Cherokee (largest community) (Cherokee sites within the Qualla Boundary)

Unincorporated communities
 Almond
 Deals Gap
 Ela
 Hewitt
 Lauada
 Ravensford
 Wesser
 Whittier

Townships
 Charleston
 Forneys Creek
 Nantahala

See also
 List of counties in North Carolina
 National Register of Historic Places listings in Swain County, North Carolina
 National Park Service
 List of national forests of the United States
 Swain County High School

References

External links

 
 
 History of Bryson City and Swain County North Carolina 
 NCGenWeb Swain County—free genealogy resources for the county

 
1871 establishments in North Carolina
Counties of Appalachia
Populated places established in 1871